Stretham railway station was a station in Stretham, Cambridgeshire on the Ely and St Ives Railway.

History
It opened on 16 April 1866, and one of the original stations was that at Stretham. The EH&SR became the Ely and St Ives Railway in 1878 and was absorbed by the Great Eastern Railway in 1898. Regular passenger trains ceased to call at Stretham on 2 February 1931, but occasional passenger excursion trains used the station until around 1956. It was closed to goods on 13 July 1964.

The station featured a single platform, a signal box and a goods loop.

Notes

Sources

External links
 Stretham station on navigable 1946 O. S. map

Disused railway stations in Cambridgeshire
Former Great Eastern Railway stations
Railway stations in Great Britain opened in 1866
Railway stations in Great Britain closed in 1931
1866 establishments in England